is a Japanese late night variety show starring Japanese idol group Keyakizaka46. It was hosted by Yū Sawabe and Teruyuki Tsuchida and aired every Sunday at 12:35 AM JST on TV Tokyo.

History
Keyakitte, Kakenai? was first aired on October 5, 2015, roughly two months after the formation of Keyakizaka46. The show was styled similar to Nogizaka46's weekly show, Nogizaka Under Construction.

Although primarily used for variety shows, Keyakitte, Kakenai? has also been used as a platform for various announcements, including introducing Neru Nagahama to the group, and announcing participating members of the upcoming single in a process called . The show has also had a variety of guest appearances, including Sunshine Ikezaki, Kazuya Kojima, Ayano Fukuda, and Ami Kikuchi. Keyakizaka46's subgroup, Hiragana Keyakizaka46, also occasionally appeared on the show until they received their own show, Hiragana Oshi.

Due to the COVID-19 pandemic, starting from the 17 May 2020 episode, the program transitioned from recording in a studio to recording remotely via Zoom.

References

Keyakizaka46
2015 Japanese television series debuts
2020 Japanese television series endings
TV Tokyo original programming
Japanese variety television shows